The Yhagüy River is a small river running north–south in Cordillera Department, Paraguay.

In places it is little more than a stream and is also known as Arroyo Yhaguy-Guazú and Arroyo Yhaguy)

References
 

Rivers of Paraguay
Geography of Cordillera Department